Akyokuş can refer to:

 Akyokuş, Karakoçan
 Akyokuş, Mudurnu